Kars is a city in Turkey.

Kars may also refer to:

Geography
 Kars Parish, New Brunswick, a civil parish in Kings County
 Kars, New Brunswick, an unincorporated community in Kars Parish
 Kars, Ontario, a small village of the city in Ottawa, Ontario, Canada
 Kars/Rideau Valley Air Park a small airport near Kars, Ontario
 Kars Province, a province of Turkey
 Qars or Kars, a village in the Khizi Rayon of Azerbaijan

History
 Kadirli, formerly Kars, a town and district of Osmaniye Province in the Mediterranean region of Turkey
 Kars Eyalet, Ottoman Empire
 Kars Oblast, Russian Empire
 Kars Republic

Other uses
 Jean-Rodolphe Kars (born 1947), French pianist
 "Kars 1" and "Kars 2 (Wounds of the Centuries)," two songs by Armenian pianist Tigran Hamasyan from his 2015 album Mockroot.
 Kars dog, a breed of livestock guardian dog from eastern Turkey
 Kars, the primary antagonist from the manga JoJo's Bizarre Adventure: Battle Tendency

See also
Cars (disambiguation)
Kar's Nuts, a United States manufacturer of nut and snack items
KARS (disambiguation)